Rincon Point may mean:

Places in:

California
Rincon Point (San Francisco) 
Rincon Point (Santa Barbara County) part of the Rincon (surfspot)

Texas
Rincon Point (Nueces County)